The United States Marine Corps History Division is a branch of Headquarters Marine Corps tasked with researching, writing, and maintaining the History of the United States Marine Corps. It also provides reference and research assistance; preserves personal experiences and observations through oral history interviews; and deploys field historians to record history in the making. It is headquartered at Marine Corps Base Quantico in Virginia.

History
The History Division was formed on 8 September 1919, by Order Number 53 of Commandant of the Marine Corps George Barnett as the Historical Section of the Department of the Adjutant and Inspector. After World War II, the organization was known as "Marine Corps History and Museums Division" until the splitting of the division in 2005 in order to create the National Museum of the Marine Corps.

Organization
The United States Marine Corps History Division is a staff organization with the primary task of researching and writing the Marine Corps’ official history. The unit is not a division-sized military formation. It is organized into four branches:
 The Historical Branch prepares a wide variety of official publications that tell the Marine Corps story as accurately and comprehensively as possible. Publications include: articles, monographs, occasional papers, and definitive histories. The Branch also includes the Oral History Program, which obtains, catalogs, transcribes, and preserves personal narrative, experiences and observations of historic value from active duty and retired Marines for use as reference source material.
 The Historical Reference Branch provides historical research and reference services and historical analysis. In addition, the Branch supports specific programs: Unit Lineage and Honors, Commemorative Naming, Marine Corps Flag Manual, and Marine Corps Chronology.
 The Field History Branch deploys Individual Mobilization Augmentee detachment historians to collect historically relevant material (oral history, written/electronic plans, operation orders, maps, overlays and artifacts) for use as reference material. The Branch also consists of a Mobilization Training Unit whose members support the History Division with specific projects.
 The Editing and Design branch designs and lays out manuscripts, maps and other graphic materials to support the History Division’s publications.

Directors
Since its inception, the following individuals have served as director:

Publications
The History Division maintains several publications, including the quarterly newsletter Fortitudine, which was a traditional motto of the Corps before semper fidelis was adapted in 1883. They also maintain an archive of all historical publications published since its founding.

See also
 History of the United States Marine Corps
 Naval History & Heritage Command
 United States Army Center of Military History
 Department of Defense Historical Advisory Committee
 National Museum of the Marine Corps & Marine Corps Museum
 Marine Corps University
 Bibliography of early American naval history

References

External links
 Official website

History of the United States Marine Corps
Military units and formations of the United States Marine Corps
History organizations based in the United States
Military historiography
Military archives